Godfrey Steyn (23 August 1934 – 14 June 2015) was a South African cricketer. He played first-class cricket for North Eastern Transvaal, Transvaal and Western Province.

References

External links
 

1934 births
2015 deaths
South African cricketers
Northerns cricketers
Gauteng cricketers
Western Province cricketers
Cricketers from Pretoria